William Herrick Macaulay (16 November 1853 – 28 November 1936) was a British mathematician, Fellow and Vice-Provost of King's College, Cambridge, and close friend of Karl Pearson.   He also corresponded with John Maynard Keynes

Family

He was born in Hodnet, Shropshire in 1853, son of the Rev. Samuel Herrick Macaualay, rector of Hodnet and grandson of the Rev. Aulay Macaulay. His brothers included George Campbell Macaulay, the father of Dame Rose Macaulay, and Reginald Macaulay. He died in Clent in 1936.

Education, Career, Later Life

He received a B.A. from Durham University (1874) and an M.A. from Cambridge (1877). 

He is known for his work in engineering and proposed a mechanical technique for the structural analysis, for purposes of beam or shaft deflection.

He worked in a granite quarry company.

References 

 ‘MACAULAY, William Herrick’, Who Was Who, A & C Black, an imprint of Bloomsbury Publishing plc, 1920–2008; online edn, Oxford University Press, Dec 2007 accessed 28 March 2013
 The Times, Monday, 30 November 1936; pg. 14; Issue 47545; col D. Mr. W. H. Macaulay King's College, Cambridge University.

See also 

Alfred Clebsch 
Adhémar Jean Claude Barré de Saint-Venant

External links
 

1853 births
1936 deaths
Fellows of King's College, Cambridge
19th-century British mathematicians
20th-century British mathematicians
Alumni of University College, Durham